Brickellia oblongifolia, the Mojave brickellbush, is North American species of plants in the family Asteraceae. It is widespread across arid and semi-arid regions in the western United States and Canada, from British Columbia south to southern California, Arizona, and New Mexico.

Brickellia oblongifolia is a perennial herb of subshrub up to 60 cm (24 inches) tall, growing from a woody caudex. Flower heads sometime appear one at a time, sometimes in groups of several, each head cream-colored or pale yellow-green, containing disc florets but no ray florets.

Varieties
 Brickellia oblongifolia var. linifolia (D.C.Eaton) B.L.Rob. - Arizona, California, Nevada, Utah, New Mexico, Colorado, Wyoming, Montana, Idaho, Washington
 Brickellia oblongifolia var. oblongifolia - British Columbia, Washington, Idaho, Oregon, Nevada, Montana

References

oblongifolia
Plants described in 1840
Flora of Western Canada
Flora of the Northwestern United States
Flora of the Southwestern United States
Flora of the South-Central United States
Flora without expected TNC conservation status